Auchenipterichthys thoracatus is a species of driftwood catfish endemic to Peru where it is found in the Amazon River basin.  It grows to a length of 11.0 cm.

References

 

Auchenipteridae
Freshwater fish of Peru
Fish described in 1858